Chorus Gentlemen is a Canadian music television series which aired on CBC Television from 1965 to 1967.

Premise
This series was hosted by David Glyn-Jones. Like Chorus Anyone in 1964, it was produced in Vancouver and regularly featured a men's choir, although the choir was now directed by Bobby Reid in the initial 1965 episodes, then by Brian Gibson for the remainder of the series run. Initially, episodes featured popular songs from the 1930s and 1940s, a scope later expanded to include selections from the 1890s to the 1960s. Ralph Grierson (piano) and Bud Henderson (bandleader) were among the series regulars who were joined by various guests.

Scheduling
This half-hour series was broadcast from 1965 to 1967 as follows (times are Eastern):

References

External links
 

CBC Television original programming
1965 Canadian television series debuts
1967 Canadian television series endings